Confession is the second album released by the American heavy metal band Ill Niño. The album debuted at #37 in the Billboard Top 200 with first week sales of 27,863.  It has been their most successful album to date. It was the first album to not feature Marc Rizzo, who left during recording to join Soulfly, and also the first to feature Ahrue Luster, formerly of Machine Head.

Track listing

Notes:
 The iTunes bonus tracks "Make Me Feel" and "Clear" are the same as "Someone or Something" and "I'll Find a Way", respectively. They seemingly retained their demo titles on iTunes for unknown reasons.
 A fan-made compilation titled Demo Sessions includes three demo tracks from the album's recording sessions, "Make Me Feel" (with different lyrics), "About Them" and "Every Day". It also includes acoustic performances of "How Can I Live" and "This Time's for Real", recorded live at the AAF studios.
 "Have You Ever Felt?" is featured in the game Ghost Recon Advanced Warfighter for the Xbox 360.
 "When It Cuts" is featured in the PlayStation Portable game Infected.
 "How Can I Live" is featured in the horror film Freddy vs. Jason and appears on the soundtrack.
 "I'll Find a Way" is featured on the soundtrack to the 2005 film The Cave, titled "I'll Find the Way".

Personnel

Ill Niño
Cristian Machado – vocals
Ahrue Luster – lead guitar
Jardel Paisante – rhythm guitar
Laz Piña – bass guitar
Omar Clavijo – keyboards, turntables, programming
Danny Couto – percussion
Dave Chavarri – drums

Additional personnel
Joe Rodriguez – additional percussion
Marc Rizzo – additional guitar/ acoustic guitar (on tracks 2, 4, 6–8, 10–17)
Max Illidge – additional vocals (on track 9) (40 Below Summer, Black Market Hero)
Mikey Doling – additional guitar (on track 3) (Snot, ex-Soulfly, ex-Abloom, currently Invitro)
Bob Marlette - additional piano (on tracks 8, 12, 15, 17)

References

2003 albums
Ill Niño albums
Roadrunner Records albums
Albums produced by Bob Marlette